Jeff Tapper is a technologist and theatrical lighting designer based in New York City. He is currently a senior vice president of engineering at Viacom.  He was formerly  a partner at Digital Primates, a software design company. He has written and contributed to many books and speaks frequently at international conferences about internet technologies, including ColdFusion, Adobe Flash, Adobe Flex, MPEG-DASH, streaming video and software engineering best practices.

Career
Tapper began building internet applications in 1995.

Tapper moved to New York in 1992 to serve as the Gilbert Hemsley lighting intern, and subsequently worked on dozens of theatre productions in New York and regional theatres, including the New York City Opera, the Steppenwolf Theatre, the Mark Taper Forum, and La MaMa E.T.C.

Many of the productions Tapper has lit have been reviewed in The New York Times. Tapper's lighting of the dance/rock production The Tooth of Crime attracted positive reviews.

In the 2000s Tapper wrote and co-wrote a number of how-to books about commonly used software products. He spoke frequently at technology conferences on topics include Video Streaming, XML, Enterprise Application Development, as well as on specific technologies such as Adobe ColdFusion, Apache Flex, MPEG-DASH. He also wrote articles about modern technology, which were published by Adobe Press, Modern Web and InformIT.  In 2014 Tapper recorded a JavaScript training video, JavaScript Essentials - LiveLessons, which has been published by Addison-Wesley Professional.

Bibliography

Allaire Spectra e-Business Construction Kit, Que Publishing, 2000, 0-7897-2365-4

References

External links
Jeff Tapper's profile at AdobePress.com

Living people
American computer businesspeople
American technology writers
Year of birth missing (living people)